Xinhua is a town of Tongyu County in northwestern Jilin province, China, located  southwest of the county seat and about half that northwest of the border with Inner Mongolia. , it has one residential community and 14 villages under its administration.

See also
List of township-level divisions of Jilin

References

Township-level divisions of Jilin